WLEY (1080 AM, "Radio Ley") is a radio station licensed to serve Cayey, Puerto Rico.  The station was founded on September 8, 1964 and it is owned by Media Power Group, Inc. WLEY is part of the Radio Isla Network. It airs a Spanish language News Talk Information format.

The station was assigned the WLEY call letters by the Federal Communications Commission.

Ownership
In July 1999, Uno Radio of Ponce Inc., Caguas, P.R. (Jesus M. Soto, chairman) reached an agreement to purchase five radio stations in Puerto Rico from Ponce Broadcasting Corp. (Janero G. Scarano Sr., Julio C. Braum, Luis F. Sala, Catalina Scarano and Sala Business Corp., shareholders) for a reported sale price of $10.75 million.

In June 2003, Media Power Group Inc. (Eduardo Rivero Albino, chairman, Gilberto Rivera Gutierrez, Jose E. Fernandez and Joe Pagan, shareholders) reached an agreement to purchase four AM radio stations in Puerto Rico, including WLEY, from Uno Radio Group. (Jesus M. Soto, owner) for a reported $6.8 million.

References

External links

LEY
Radio stations established in 1964
Cayey, Puerto Rico
1964 establishments in Puerto Rico